Marzuban ibn Bakhtiyar was a Buyid prince, and the son of the Buyid ruler of Iraq, 'Izz al-Dawla Bakhtiyar.

Little is known of Marzuban's life. In 970, he married a daughter of the Turkic officer Bukhtakin Azadruwayh. After the defeat of his father in 977 at the hands of his relative 'Adud al-Dawla, he, along with his father and uncles went to Damascus, where they were warmly received by its ruler, Alptakin, who, however, made them involved in his conflict with the Fatimid Caliphate of Egypt.

A battle shortly ensured at Ramla between the army of Alptakin and the Fatimids. However, during the battle, Marzuban betrayed Alptakin and abandoned the battlefield. The forces of Alptakin were shortly defeated, and Marzuban's uncle Abu Tahir was killed, while his other uncle Abu Ishaq Ibrahim was taken captive by the Fatimids. Nothing further is heard of Marzuban.

References

Sources 
 

10th-century births
10th-century Iranian people
Buyid princes
Year of death unknown
10th century in Asia